Charles van Onselen is a researcher and historian based at the University of Pretoria, South Africa.

Education
Van Onselen holds a B.Sc. and U.E.D. from Rhodes University, a B.A. Hons. from the University of the Witwatersrand, a D.Phil. from Oxford University and a D.Lit.(Honoris Causa) from Rhodes.

Academic career
He is based at the University of Pretoria, South Africa.

Recognition and awards
He received the Alan Paton Award for The Seed is Mine in 1997.

Selected works
The Seed is Mine: The Life of Kas Maine, a South African Sharecropper 1894–1985 (1996),  described as a "detailed and compelling history of the effect of South Africa's Land Laws on one man and his family"
 New Babylon New Nineveh: Everyday life on the Witwatersand 1886–1914, a social and economic history of the late nineteenth/early twentieth century Witwatersrand
The Fox and the Flies (2007), a social, political, and economic history of the Trans-Atlantic underworld from about 1890 until 1918, the year Joseph Silver was executed by the Austro-Hungarian military, in which Van Onselen speculates that Silver could have been Jack the Ripper

Bibliography 

The Night Trains. Johannesburg: Jonathan Ball Publishers. 2019.  .

References 

Year of birth missing (living people)
Living people
20th-century South African historians
Academic staff of the University of Pretoria
Historians of South Africa
Fellows of the Royal Society of South Africa
Historians of Zimbabwe
21st-century South African historians